'' is located near Saindak town in Chagai District of Balochistan, Pakistan. The discovery of gold, copper & silver deposits at Saindak was made in the 1970s in collaboration with ahe Saindak Copper-Gold Project was set up by Saindak Metals Ltd, a company fully owned by the Government of Pakistan, by the end of 1995 at a cost of PKR 13.5 billion. Currently Metallurgical Corporation of China is operating two mechanized hard rock underground Copper-Gold mines with current production of 7.25T per annum of copper-gold from smelting process

Pakistan and China signed a formal contract worth $350 million for development of Saindak Copper-Gold mine project. The mines were leased for a 10-year period to Metallurgical Corporation of China Ltd. (MCC), a subsidiary of the China Metallurgical Group Corporation.

History

Trial production at the Saindak Copper-Gold project started in 1995 with commitment of funding from the Government of Pakistan. The four-month trial operation had a monthly production rate of 1700 ton of copper, 6000 oz of gold, 12000 oz of silver. A 50 MW power plant was constructed at Saindak with aid grants from Germany and France. German and French aid grants and the Balochistan government also funded the bulk water supply system of 32,000 tonnes of daily drinking water, water treatment plant, warehouse, workshops, laboratories, storage, airport and railroad link with ECO Highway. The 30 km railway link to Kuh-i-Taftan station appears disused in all Google Earth images since 2010. The Balochistan government also invested funds in building a township with schools, hospitals, shopping plazas, streets, lighting and water pipelines for over 2000 residents.

After the construction of the infrastructure and the trial run, the project was to be operated by Saindak Metals Ltd, a company owned by the Pakistan government. The federal government was to provide funding for operations of the mine through Saindak Metals. Proceeds from the mine were then to be split between the provincial government of Balochistan and the federal government of Pakistan. However, the PKR 17 Billion required to start operations were not received due to political wrangling and bureaucratic delays. As a result, after the 1995 trial run, the project faltered for a number of years. The Federal Cabinet of Pakistan on September 26, 2017 approved five years extension of the lease contract of Saindak Copper Gold project to Chinese firm, reports Dispatch News Desk (DND) News Agency. The existing lease agreement term would expire on October 31, 2017. Now Chinese firm will continue to work till October 30, 2022.

As per the Aghaz-e-Haqooq-e-Balochistan package, the federal government agreed to transfer a majority of its holdings in Saindak Metals Ltd to the provincial government. The Balochistan government would then receive 35% of the proceeds from the mine. However, this transfer of shares was stalled when the federal government demanded that Saindak Metals first repay PKR 29 Billion to the federal government which the government had invested in Saindak Metals. The company repaid PKR 6 billion to the federal government but then ran out of funds. So it offered the federal government an additional 20% stake in the company (for another 10% of proceeds from the mine) in lieu of the remaining loan amount. However, the Pakistan government has refused to transfer the shares in the company to the Balochistan government.

Another cause for concern for the provincial government has been over mining of resources from Saindak. With MCC mining more ore from the mine than originally estimated, Balochistan was concerned that there would be fewer years of life in the mine once it receives ownership.

References

External links
 Saindak Copper Gold Project #5363
 Saindak Copper Gold Project #2816

Mining in Balochistan, Pakistan
Chagai District
Copper mines in Pakistan
Gold mines in Pakistan
Mining companies of Pakistan
China–Pakistan relations
1995 establishments in Pakistan